The Men's Freestyle  125 kg is a competition featured at the 2018 European Wrestling Championships, is scheduled to be held in Kaspiysk, Russia on May 5 and May 6.

Medalists

Results 
 Legend
 F — Won by fall

Main Bracket

Repechage

References

Men's freestyle 125 kg